The 2021 Bretagne Classic Ouest–France is a road cycling one-day race that took place on 29 August 2021 in the region of Brittany in northwestern France. It was the 85th edition of the Bretagne Classic Ouest–France and the 25th event of the 2021 UCI World Tour.

The first half of the race saw riders head west out of Ploauy and ride through Scaër on the way to Douarnenez along the Atlantic coast. Once there, the course turned back east towards Ploauy and once again passed through Scaër to form a rough figure eight. On the way back to Ploauy after passing through Scaër for the second time, riders ascended Saoutalarin, the race's only gravel climb. The race concluded with a  finishing circuit in and around Ploauy.

Teams 
All nineteen UCI WorldTeams and five UCI ProTeams made up the twenty-four teams that participated in the race. Of these teams, only four did not field a full squad of seven riders. In total, 163 riders started the race, of which only 96 finished.

UCI WorldTeams

 
 
 
 
 
 
 
 
 
 
 
 
 
 
 
 
 
 
 

UCI ProTeams

Result

References

Sources

External links 

Bretagne Classic Ouest-France
Bretagne Classic Ouest-France
Bretagne Classic Ouest-France
2021